Adams Township is one of fourteen townships in Carroll County, Indiana. As of the 2010 census, its population was 516 and it contained 209 housing units.

History
Adams Township was organized in 1828.

The Burris House and Potawatomi Spring, Carrollton Bridge, and Wabash and Erie Canal Culvert No. 100 are listed on the National Register of Historic Places.

Geography

Unincorporated towns
 Lockport

Adjacent townships
 Jackson Township, White County (north)
 Jefferson Township, Cass County (northeast)
 Clinton Township, Cass County (east)
 Liberty (east)
 Rock Creek (southeast)
 Deer Creek (south)
 Tippecanoe (southwest)
 Jefferson (west)
 Lincoln Township, White County (northwest)

Cemeteries
The township contains three cemeteries: Great Eastern, Johnson City and Seceder.

Education
Adams Township residents may obtain a library card at the Delphi Public Library in Delphi.

References
 
 United States Census Bureau cartographic boundary files

External links

 Indiana Township Association
 United Township Association of Indiana

Townships in Carroll County, Indiana
Lafayette metropolitan area, Indiana
Townships in Indiana
1828 establishments in Indiana